Active Measures may refer to: 

 Active measures, political warfare conducted by the Russian or Soviet government
 Active Measures (film), a 2018 documentary film about Russian interference in the 2016 U.S. election
 "Active Measures" (Homeland), a 2018 TV episode
 "Active Measures", a 2015 episode of NCIS: Los Angeles
 Active Measures: The Secret History of Disinformation and Political Warfare, a book

See also